Hyperoartia or Petromyzontida is a disputed group of vertebrates that includes the modern lampreys and their fossil relatives.  Examples of hyperoartians from early in their fossil record are Endeiolepis and Euphanerops (which possessed a calcified branchial basket), fish-like animals with hypocercal tails that lived during the Late Devonian Period. Some paleontologists still place these forms among the "ostracoderms" (jawless armored fishes) of the class Anaspida, but this is increasingly considered an artificial arrangement based on ancestral traits.

Placement of this group among the jawless vertebrates is a matter of dispute. While today enough fossil diversity is known to make a close relationship among the "ostracoderms" unlikely, this has muddied the issue of the Hyperoartia's closest relatives. Traditionally the group was placed in a superclass Cyclostomata together with the Myxini (hagfishes). More recently, it has been proposed that the Myxini are more basal among the skull-bearing chordates, while the Hyperoartia are retained among vertebrates. But even though this may be correct, the lampreys represent one of the oldest divergences of the vertebrate lineage, and whether they are better united with some "ostracoderms" in the Cephalaspidomorphi, or not closer to these than to e.g. to other "ostracoderms" of the Pteraspidomorphi, or even the long-extinct conodonts, is still to be resolved. Even the very existence of the class Hyperoartia is disputed, with some analyses favoring a treatment of the "basal Hyperoartia" as a monophyletic lineage Jamoytiiformes that may in fact be very close to the ancestral jawed vertebrates.

The only hyperoartians surviving today are lampreys, classified in the Petromyzontiformes.  The discovery of the fossil Priscomyzon pushed back the oldest known occurrence of true lampreys to the Late Devonian.  The evidence of phylogeny, however, suggests the lamprey lineage diverged much earlier from other vertebrates, rather than arising from among the "ostracoderms".  The origin of Hyperoartia may therefore extend back to the early Paleozoic, if not earlier.

Taxonomy and Phylogeny
Placed in this group are at present: Mikko's Phylogeny Archive, Nelson, Grande & Wilson 2016 and van der Laan 2018.

 Clade Hyperoartia Müller 1844
 Family †Hardistiellidae Halstead, 1993
 Family †Mayomyzonidae Bardack, 1971
 Family †Pipisciidae Halstead, 1993
 Genus †Mesomyzon Chang, Zhang & Miao 2006
 Genus †Priscomyzon Gess, Coates & Rubidge 2006
 Order Petromyzontiformes (Lampreys)
 Family Geotriidae (pouched lamprey)
 Family Mordaciidae (southern topeyed lampreys)
 Family Petromyzontidae Risso, 1827 (Northern lampreys)

References

 
Fish classes